The 1946 Illinois State Normal Redbirds football team represented Illinois State Normal University—now known as Illinois State University—as a member of the Illinois Intercollegiate Athletic Conference (IIAC) during  1946 college football season. In their second year under head coach Edwin Struck, the Redbirds compiled an overall record of 6–3 record with a mark of 2–2 in conference play, finished third in the IIAC, and outscored opponents by  a total of 106 to 53.  Illinois State Normal played home games at McCormick Field in Normal, Illinois.

Schedule

References

Illinois State Normal
Illinois State Redbirds football seasons
Illinois State Normal Redbirds football